The Free University of Brussels (or ULB; , later Vrije Universiteit Brussel) was a university in Brussels, Belgium. Founded in 1834 on the principle of "free inquiry" (libre examen), its founders envisaged the institution as a free-thinker reaction to the traditional dominance of Catholicism in Belgian education. The institution was avowedly secular and particularly associated with Liberal political movements during the era of pillarisation. The Free University was one of Belgium's major universities, together with the Catholic University of Leuven and the state universities of Liège and Ghent.

The "Linguistic Wars" affected the Free University, which split along language lines in 1969 in the aftermath of student unrest at Leuven the previous year. Today two institutions carry the "Free University of Brussels" name: the French-speaking Université libre de Bruxelles (ULB) and the Dutch-speaking Vrije Universiteit Brussel (VUB). Although separate, both institutions continue to collaborate under the auspices of an umbrella organisation known as Brussels Free Universities.

History

Establishment of a university in Brussels

The Free University of Brussels was founded as the Free University of Belgium (Université libre de Belgique) on 20 November 1834 in the aftermath of Belgium's independence in 1830. Belgium had possessed three State universities at Leuven, Ghent, and Liège under Dutch rule but teaching had been extensively disrupted by the revolution and continued hostilities with the Dutch. As early as 1831, Belgian freemasons of the Les Amis philanthropes lodge had considered founding a new private university. News of the imminent creation of the Catholic University of Mechelen revived the initiative among those with anti-clerical ideas, especially freemasons, liberals, and other freethinkers. Pierre-Théodore Verhaegen and Auguste Baron led the fundraising for the new institution from April 1834. It was officially founded on 20 November 1834 in the former Palace of Charles of Lorraine in Brussels with the help of the liberal mayor Nicolas-Jean Rouppe. The date of its establishment is still commemorated annually, by students of its successor institutions, as a holiday called Saint-Verhaegen/Sint-Verhaegen (often shortened to St V) for Pierre-Théodore Verhaegen.

The motivating principle behind the new institution was "free inquiry" (libre examen) which denoted freethinking ideas inherited from the European Enlightenment. This hostility to political and religious authority led to hostility from the Catholic Church and Catholic Party politicians, increasingly associated with the Mechelen university's successor, the Catholic University of Leuven founded in 1835. Under the system of pillarisation, the Free University became one of the principle institutions in the Liberal "pillar". It was renamed the Université libre de Bruxelles ("Free University of Brussels") in 1842.

After its establishment, the Free University faced difficult times, since it did receive no subsidies or grants from the government; yearly fundraising events and tuition fees provided the only financial means. Verhaegen, who became a professor and later head of the new university, gave it a mission statement which he summarised in a speech to King Leopold I: "the principle of free inquiry and academic freedom uninfluenced by any political or religious authority." In 1858, the Catholic Church established the Saint-Louis Institute in the city, which subsequently expanded into a university in its own right.

Growth, internal tensions and move

The Free University grew significantly over the following decades. In 1842, it moved to the Granvelle Palace, which it occupied until 1928. It expanded the number of subjects taught and, in 1880, became one of the first institutions in Belgium to allow female students to study in some faculties. In 1893, it received large grants from Ernest and Alfred Solvay and Raoul Warocqué to open new faculties in the city. A disagreement over an invite to the anarchist geographer Élisée Reclus to speak at the university in 1893 led to some of the liberal and socialist faculty splitting away from the Free University to form the New University of Brussels (Université nouvelle de Bruxelles) in 1894. The institution failed to displace the Free University, however, and closed definitively in 1919.

In 1900, the Free University's football team won the bronze medal at the Summer Olympics. After Racing Club de Bruxelles declined to participate, a student selection with players from the university was sent by the Federation. The team was enforced with a few non-students. The Institute of Sociology was founded in 1902, then in 1904 the Solvay School of Commerce, which would later become the Solvay Brussels School of Economics and Management. In 1911, the university obtained its legal personality under the name Université libre de Bruxelles - Vrije Hogeschool te Brussel.

The German occupation during World War I led to the suspension of classes for four years in 1914–1918. In the aftermath of the war, the Free University moved its principle activities to the Solbosch in the southern suburb of Ixelles and a purpose-built university campus was created, funded by the Belgian American Educational Foundation. The university was again closed by the German occupiers during World War II on 25 November 1941. Students from the university were involved in the Belgian Resistance, establishing Groupe G which focused on sabotage.

Splitting of the university

Until the early 20th century, courses at the Free University were taught exclusively in French, the language of the upper class in Belgium at that time, as well as of law and academia. However, with the Dutch-speaking population asking for more rights in Belgium (see Flemish Movement), some courses began being taught in both French and Dutch at the Faculty of Law as early as 1935. Nevertheless, it was not until 1963 that all faculties offered their courses in both languages. Tensions between French- and Dutch-speaking students in the country came to a head in 1968 when the Catholic University of Leuven split along linguistic lines, becoming the first of several national institutions to do so.

On 1 October 1969, the French and Dutch entities of the Free University separated into two distinct sister universities. This splitting became official with the act of 28 May 1970, of the Belgian Parliament, by which the French-speaking Université libre de Bruxelles (ULB) and the Dutch-speaking Vrije Universiteit Brussel (VUB) officially became two separate legal, administrative and scientific entities.

Notable faculty
Henri La Fontaine (1854–1943): Nobel Prize for Peace in 1913.
Jules Bordet (1870–1961): Nobel Prize in Physiology or Medicine in 1919.

See also 
 List of modern universities in Europe (1801–1945)
 :Category:Free University of Brussels (1834–1969) alumni
 First School War
 List of split up universities

References

 
Vrije Universiteit Brussel
Université libre de Bruxelles
19th century in Brussels
20th century in Brussels
Universities and colleges in Belgium
Educational institutions established in 1834
Educational institutions disestablished in 1969
1834 establishments in Belgium
1969 disestablishments in Belgium
Freemasonry in Belgium